Patricia Alfred is a Trinidadian former cricketer who played as a right-arm medium-fast bowler. She appeared in one Test match and one One Day International for the West Indies in 1979.

References

External links
 
 

Living people
Date of birth missing (living people)
Year of birth missing (living people)
West Indian women cricketers
West Indies women Test cricketers
West Indies women One Day International cricketers